This is a list of television programs which are currently, formerly, or are soon to be broadcast on Public Television Company of Armenia.

Current programming of Armenia 1

News and information
 Agenda 
 The First on Economics
 Parliamentary Week 
 Agenda: Interview 
 At the Square
 360° 
 Off the Agenda 
 Journalism by Profession 
 First Pavilion

Dramas
 Open Your Eyes
 Against the Flow

Game shows
 Love Formula 
 Bonus
 Hay-Q
 Hayastan Jan 
 Armenian Night

Reality/other
 Lets cook together
 Nice Evening
 National Music Channel
 Musical Post
 National Music Awards
 National Music Awards Diary
 Emmy - First CD Presentation Solo Concert
 Hot 10
 Hot 10 Diary
 Top 10
 Top 50
 Top 2006
 Top 2007
 Top 2008
 Top 2009
 Top 2010
 Top 2011
 Top 2012
 Two Stars
 Two Stars Diary
 32 Teeth Club
 Open Project
 Foreign games
 Rubicon
 Rubicon +
 Made in USSR
 Golden Clarinet
 Resolution
 Europolis
 Late Night
 Saturday Evering
 Health
 Sanatorium
 The First Program
 The First Wave Cafe
 Fairy-Tale Calling
 Once Upon A Time
 Faces
 Quality Mark
 Mechanics of Happiness
 Found Dream
 Canticle of Canticles 
 Open Lesson
 Cities of the World
 Quotation Marks
 On the Roads of Armenia 
 The Devotees 
 Armed Forces 
 Life on Border
 Tandem

Former programming
 Benefis
 Name that Tune
 With the Whole Family
 Towards Artsakh

References

External links

Armenia 1